Cartier International SNC, or simply Cartier, is a French luxury goods conglomerate that designs, manufactures, distributes, and sells jewellery, leather goods, and watches. Founded by Louis-François Cartier (1819–1904) in Paris in 1847, the company remained under family control until 1964. The company is headquartered in Paris and is a wholly owned subsidiary of the Swiss Richemont Group. Cartier operates more than 200 stores in 125 countries, with three Temples (Historical Maisons) in London, New York, and Paris.

Cartier is regarded as one of the most prestigious jewellery manufacturers. Forbes ranked Cartier on its Most Valuable Brands list as 56th in 2020, with a brand value of $12.2 B and revenue of $6.2 B.

Cartier has a long history of sales to royalty. King Edward VII referred to Cartier as "the jeweller of kings and the king of jewellers." For his coronation in 1902, Edward VII ordered 27 tiaras and issued a royal warrant to Cartier in 1904. Similar warrants soon followed from the courts of Spain, Portugal, Serbia, Russia and the House of Orléans.

History

Early history
Louis-François Cartier founded Cartier in Paris in 1847 when he took over the workshop of his master, Adolphe Picard. In 1874, Louis-François' son Alfred Cartier took over the company, but it was Alfred's sons Louis, Pierre, and Jacques who established the brand name worldwide.

Louis ran the Paris branch, moving to the Rue de la Paix in 1899. He was responsible for some of the company's most celebrated designs, such as the mystery clocks (a type of clock with a transparent dial and so named because its mechanism is hidden), fashionable wristwatches and exotic orientalist Art Deco designs, including the colorful "Tutti Frutti" jewels.

In 1904, Brazilian pioneer aviator, Alberto Santos-Dumont complained to his friend Louis Cartier of the unreliability and impracticality of using pocket watches while flying. Cartier designed a flat wristwatch with a distinctive square bezel that was favored by Santos-Dumont and many other customers. This was the first and only time the brand would name a watch after its original wearer. The "Santos" watch was Cartier's first men's wristwatch. In 1907, Cartier signed a contract with Edmond Jaeger, who agreed to exclusively supply the movements for Cartier watches. Among the Cartier team was Charles Jacqueau, who joined Louis Cartier in 1909 for the rest of his life, and Jeanne Toussaint, who was Director of Fine Jewellery from 1933.

Pierre Cartier established a New York City branch in 1909, moving in 1917 to 653 Fifth Avenue, the Neo-Renaissance mansion of Morton Freeman Plant (son of railroad tycoon Henry B. Plant), designed by architect C.P.H. Gilbert. Cartier purchased it from the Plants in exchange for $100 in cash and a double-stranded natural pearl necklace valued at the time at $1 million. By this time, Cartier had branches in London, New York and Saint Petersburg and was quickly becoming one of the most successful watch companies.

Designed by Louis Cartier, the Tank watch was introduced in 1919 and was inspired by the newly introduced tanks on the Western Front in World War I. In the early 1920s, Cartier formed a joint-stock company with Edward Jaeger (of Jaeger-LeCoultre) to produce movements solely for Cartier. Cartier continued to use movements from other makers: Vacheron Constantin, Audemars Piguet, Movado, and LeCoultre. It was also during this period that Cartier began adding its own reference numbers its watches by stamping a four-digit code on the underside of a lug. Jacques took charge of the London operations and eventually moved to the current address at New Bond Street.

Re-organization 
After the death of Pierre in 1964, Jean-Jacques Cartier (Jacques's son), Claude Cartier (Louis's son), and Marion Cartier Claudel (Pierre's daughter)—who respectively headed the Cartier affiliates in London, New York, and Paris—sold the businesses.

In 1972, Robert Hocq, assisted by a group of investors led by Joseph Kanoui, bought Cartier Paris. In 1974 and 1976, respectively, the group repurchased Cartier London and Cartier New York, thus reconnecting Cartier worldwide. The new president of Cartier, Robert Hocq, coined the phrase "Les Must de Cartier" (a staff member is said to have said "Cartier, It's a must!" meaning something one simply must have) with Alain Dominique Perrin, who was a General Director of the company. As a result, in 1976, "Les Must de Cartier" became a diffusion line of Cartier, with Alain D. Perrin being its CEO.

In 1979, the Cartier interests were combined, with Cartier Monde uniting and controlling Cartier Paris, London, and New York. Joseph Kanoui became vice president of Cartier Monde. In December 1979, following the accidental death of president Robert Hocq, Nathalie Hocq (daughter of Hocq) became president.

Recent development 

In 1981, Alain Dominique Perrin was appointed Chairman of Cartier SAA and Cartier International. The next year, Micheline Kanoui, wife of Joseph Kanoui, became head of jewellery design and launched her first collection "Nouvelle Joaillerie." In 1984, Perrin founded the Fondation Cartier pour l'Art Contemporain to bring Cartier into the twenty-first century, by forming an association with living artists. In 1986, the French Ministry for Culture appointed Perrin head of the "Mission sur le mécénat d'entreprise" (a commission to study business patronage of the arts). Two years later, Cartier gained a majority holding in Piaget and Baume & Mercier. From 1989 to 1990, the Musée du Petit Palais staged an exhibition of the Cartier collection, "L'Art de Cartier."

Perrin founded an international committee in 1991, Comité International de la Haute Horlogerie, to organize its first salon, held on 15 April 1991; this has become an annual meeting place in Geneva for professionals in this field. The next year, the second exhibition of "L'Art de Cartier" was held at the Hermitage Museum in St Petersburg. In 1993, the "Vendôme Luxury Group" was formed as an umbrella company to combine Cartier, Dunhill, Montblanc, Piaget, Baume & Mercier, Karl Lagerfeld, Chloé, Sulka, Hackett, and Seeger.

In 1994, the Cartier Foundation moved to the Rive Gauche and opened headquarters in a building designed for it by Jean Nouvel. The next year, a major exhibition of the Cartier Antique Collection was held in Asia. In 1996, the Lausanne Hermitage Foundation in Switzerland exhibited "Splendours of the Jewellery", presenting a hundred and fifty years of products by Cartier.

In 2012, Cartier was owned, through Richemont, by the South African Rupert family, and Elle Pagels, a 24-year-old granddaughter of Pierre Cartier.

Managing directors 

Laurent E. Feniou - (25 March 2013 – present).
 Rupert J. Brooks - (16 December 2015 – present).
 Francois M. J. R. Le Troquer - (1 September 2010 – 28 March 2013).
 Bernard M. Fornas - (21 January 2003 – 16 December 2015).
 Guy J. Leymarie - (2 September 2002 – 28 October 2002).
 Grieg O. Catto - (2 April – present).
 Denys E. Pasche - (2 April 2002 – 17 July 2002).
 David W. Merriman - (2 April 2002 – 17 July 2002).
 Richard P. Lepeu - (1 November 2000 – 1 April 2002).
 Sophie Cagnard - (1 November 2000 – 1 April 2002).
 Gerard S. Djaoui - (12 June 1997 – 1 April 2002).
 Francois Meffre - (11 June 1993 – 28 September 2000).
 Richard N. Thornby - (11 June 1993 – 7 October 1996).
 Luigi Blank - (11 June 1993 – 1 April 2002).
 Joseph W. Allgood - (22 June 1992 – 8 April 1993).
Arnaud M. Bamberger - (4 June 1992 – 16 December 2015).
 Mario Soares - (22 June 1991 – 5 March 2002).
 Joseph Kanoui - (22 June 1991 – 31 January 2000).
 William A. Craddock - (22 June 1991 – 31 October 1997).
 Christopher H. B. Honeyborne - (22 June 1991 – 31 October 1997).
 Pierre Haquet - (22 June 1991 – 8 April 1993).
 Phillipe Leopold-Metzger - (22 June 1991 – 4 June 1992).

Jewelry and watch manufacturing

Notable products 
 1911 - Launch of Santos de Cartier wristwatch.
1918 - Creation of batons for Field-Marshals Foch and Pétain.
 1919 - Launch of the Tank watch.
1921 - Creation of the Tank cintrée watch.
 1922 - Creation of the Tank Louis Cartier and Tank Chinoise watches.
 1923 - Creation of the first portico mystery clock, crowned with a statuette called Billiken.
 1926 - Creation of the Baguette watch. Cartier jewellery in its red box appeared on the Broadway stage in Anita Loos' play Gentlemen Prefer Blondes.
 1928 - Creation of the Tortue single pushpiece chronograph watch.
 1929 - Creation of the Tank à guichets watch.
 1931 - Creation of the mystery pocket watch.
 1932 - Creation of the Tank basculante watch.
 1933 - Cartier filed a patent for the "invisible mount", a stone-setting technique in which the metal of the mount disappears to show only the stones.
 1936 - Creation of the Tank asymétrique watch.
 1942 - Creation of the "Caged Bird" brooch as a symbol of the Occupation.
1944 - Cartier created the "Freed Bird" to celebrate the Liberation of France.
 1950 - Creation of a watch in the form of a ship's wheel.
 1967 - Creation of new watches in London including the Crash.
 1968 - Creation of the Maxi Oval watch.
 1969 - Creation of the Love bracelet.
1969 First inclusion of a Cartier Chronometer in a Luxury Car
 1971 - Creation of the Juste un Clou bracelet at Cartier New York.
 1973 - Creation of Les Must de Cartier by Robert Hocq with Alain-Dominique Perrin.
 1974 - Launch of the first leather collection in burgundy.
 1976 - First collection of Les Must de Cartier vermeil watches. Creation of the first oval pen. 
 1978 - Creation of the Santos de Cartier watch with a gold and steel bracelet. Creation of the first Cartier scarf collection.
 1981 - Launch of the Must de Cartier and Santos de Cartier perfumes.
 1982 - Launch of the first New Jewellery collection on the theme of gold and stones.
 1983 - Creation of the Collection Ancienne Cartier (later the Cartier Collection) to record and illustrate how the jeweller's art and its history have evolved. Creation of the Panthère de Cartier watch.
 1984 - Launch of the second New Jewellery collection on the theme of gold and pearls. Creation of the Fondation Cartier pour l'Art Contemporain in Jouy-en-Josas. 
 1985 - Launch of the Pasha de Cartier watch.
 1986 - Launch of the third New Jewellery collection on the theme of the panther.
 1987 - Launch of the Panthère de Cartier perfume. Creation of Les Maisons de Cartier tableware (porcelain, crystal and silver).
 1988 - Launch of the fourth New Jewellery collection on the theme of Egypt.
 1989 - Launch of the Tank Américaine watch. The Art of Cartier, the first major retrospective in Paris, was held at the Petit Palais.
 1995 - Creation of the Pasha C watch in steel. Launch of the So Pretty de Cartier perfume. 
 1996 - Creation of the Tank Française watch collection. Launch of the sixth New Jewellery collection on the theme of Creation. Creation of the Tank ring.
 1998 - Creation of the Collection Privée Cartier Paris Fine Watch collection.
 1999 - Creation of the Paris Nouvelle Vague Cartier jewellery collection, inspired by Paris. 
 2001 - Creation of the Délices de Cartier jewellery collection. Launch of the Roadster watch.
 2003 - Launch of the Le Baiser du Dragon and Les Délices de Goa jewellery collections.
 2007 - Launch of Ballon Bleu de Cartier watch.
 2016 - Launch of the Drive de Cartier watch.

Environmental rating 
In December 2018, World Wide Fund for Nature (WWF) released a report assigning environmental ratings to 15 major watch manufacturers and jewelers in Switzerland. Cartier (being a subsidiary of the Swiss Richemont Group) was ranked No. 2 among the 15 manufacturers and assigned an average environmental rating of "Upper Midfield," suggesting the manufacturer has taken first actions addressing the impact of its manufacturing activities on the environment and climate change. According to Cartier's official company document, the company is committed to conduct businesses "in an environmentally responsible manner" and "minimising negative environmental impacts."

Notable patrons and owners

Celebrities 
 1904 - Alberto Santos-Dumont requested a watch from Louis Cartier, leading to the creation of the Santos de Cartier, the first men's wrist watch, first sports watch, and first pilot's watch
1928 - Marjorie Merriweather Post bought from Cartier in London earrings once worn by Queen Marie-Antoinette of France.
1950 - The Hollywood actress Gloria Swanson appeared in Sunset Boulevard wearing the two diamond and rock crystal bracelets that she had bought from Cartier in 1930.
 1955 - Creation of Jean Cocteau's sword for his election to the Académie française, to the artist's own design.
1957 - Barbara Hutton bought a tiger brooch in yellow gold, onyx and jonquil diamonds.
1968 - The Mexican actress María Félix commissioned Cartier to make a diamond necklace in the form of a serpent.
1969 - Robert Kenmore, the chairman of Cartier's parent company, acquired a  pear-shaped diamond which it sold to Richard Burton and Elizabeth Taylor. The Cartier Diamond was thus renamed the Taylor-Burton Diamond.

Royalty 
1904 - Cartier received its first appointment as official purveyor to King Edward VII of the United Kingdom.
1904 - Cartier received another appointment as the purveyor for King Alfonso XIII of Spain.

 1907 - Cartier held its first exhibition and sale in Saint Petersburg, at the Grand Hotel Europe. Shortly after, it was appointed as official purveyor to Tsar Nicholas II of Russia.
1919 - Appointment as official purveyor to King Albert I of Belgium.
1921 - Appointment as official purveyor to the Prince of Wales, future King Edward VIII who, on abdicating in 1936, became the Duke of Windsor.
1924 - Queen Marie of Romania wears a Cartier tiara created to resemble the Russian kokoshnik for her portrait painted by Philip de László.
1925 - Maharaja of Patiala commissions the Patiala Necklace.
1929 - Appointment as official purveyor to King Fouad I of Egypt.
1938 - One of the smallest wristwatches in the world, by Cartier, was given to Princess Elizabeth of the United Kingdom.
1939 - Appointment as official purveyor to King Zog I of Albania.
1949 - The Duke and Duchess of Windsor bought a platinum panther brooch on a  Kashmir cabochon sapphire in Paris.
1954 - Creation for the Duchess of Windsor of a lorgnette in yellow gold, black enamel and emeralds representing a tiger.
1956 - For her marriage to Prince Rainier, Princess Grace received numerous gifts of jewellery by Cartier including her engagement ring, set with a  emerald-cut diamond.
2014 - Kate Middleton, the Duchess of Cambridge, has been seen wearing the Cartier Ballon Bleu watch.

Use of the Cartier name in other products 

From 1976 to 2003, the company lent its name to special editions of several models of the luxury US automaker Lincoln, designing a Cartier edition of the 1976 Lincoln Continental Mark IV, the 1977–79 Lincoln Continental Mark V, the 1980–81 Lincoln Continental Mark VI, and the 1982–2003 Lincoln Town Car.

Books 
 

 The Cartiers, Francesca Cartier Brickells

See also

List of watch manufacturers
Fondation Cartier pour l'Art Contemporain
 Cartier Women's Initiative Awards
 Cartier Racing Awards
 Cartier Tank watch
 Cartier Love bracelet

References

Further reading

External links

 Cartier

British Royal Warrant holders
Clothing brands of France
Companies based in Paris
Fountain pen and ink manufacturers
High fashion brands
Jewellery retailers of France
Luxury brands
Manufacturing companies established in 1847
Retail companies established in 1847
Retail companies of France
Richemont brands
Spanish Royal Warrant holders
Thai Royal Warrant holders
Watch brands
Watch manufacturing companies of France
Comité Colbert members
French companies established in 1847
Cartier